{{Infobox comedian
| name              = Jon Kenny
| image             = 
| imagesize         = 
| caption           = 
| pseudonym         = 
| birth_name        = Jonathan Kenny
| birth_date        = 
| birth_place       = Hospital, County Limerick, Ireland
| death_date        = 
| death_place       = 
| medium            = Television, film, stand-up
| nationality       = Irish
| active            = 
| subject           = 
| influences        = 
| influenced        = 
| spouse            = 
| domesticpartner   = 
| notable_work      = D'Unbelievables  Father Ted  | signature         = 
| footnotes         = 
| current_members   = 
| past_members      = 
}}

Jonathan Kenny (born 12 December 1957) is an Irish comedian and actor who lives in Lough Gur and is one half of the famous Irish comic duo d'Unbelievables with Pat Shortt. They were a very successful duo until 2000, releasing One Hell of a Video, D'Unbelievables, D'Video, D'Telly, D'Mother and D'collection but the group stopped touring after Kenny was diagnosed with Hodgkin's lymphoma.My cancer battle by comic Jon, Daily Mirror, 30 November 2000

Kenny is an accomplished singer and supporter of Munster Rugby.
Kenny completed filming a lead role in an independent Europe feature film called Insatiable, directed by Jessie Kirby.  On his new DVD, Back to Front'', Jon says he plays the nastiest man in Ireland in the film which is his first serious role. Kenny has many relatives from The Irish Midlands and the West of Ireland. His mother's maiden name is Dirraine and her grandparents came from Inis Mór in the Aran Islands.

Kenny returned to solo comedy and has performed throughout Ireland with his one-man show. In the spring of 2007, Kenny realised his first solo stand-up DVD 'Back to Front'.

Kenny created a brand new theatre show 'Mag Mell' with visual Artist Des Dillon and Musician/Composers Benny McCarthy & Conal Ó'Gráda in 2012-13.

Filmography

References

External links 
 Jon Kenny in 'Actors' file at Limerick City Library, Ireland
 Jon Kenny in 'Musicians, Singers, Comedians, etc.' file at Limerick City Library, Ireland

1957 births
Living people
Irish impressionists (entertainers)
Irish male comedians
Irish male soap opera actors
Male actors from County Limerick